Musahebpur is a village in Chaubi Gahi Shikohabad Gram panchayat in Bilhaur Tehsil, Kanpur Nagar district, Uttar Pradesh, India. It is located 60 km away from Kanpur City. According to 2011 Census of India population of the village is 648.

References

Villages in Kanpur Nagar district